Antonito or Antoñito may refer to the following:
 Antoñito (name), nickname
 Antonito, Colorado, Town in the United States
 Mimobarathra antonito, species in the Mimobarathra genus of moths

See also

Antonijo, given name
Antonino (disambiguation)
Antonio, given name
 San Antonito, Bernalillo County, New Mexico
 San Antonito, Socorro County, New Mexico